Lloigor may refer to a fictional character in the Cthulhu Mythos:

 Lloigor (Great Old One), the air elemental from "The Lair of the Star Spawn" (1932) by August Derleth and Mark Schorer
 Lloigor (Cthulhu Mythos race), invisible psychic beings from "the Return of the Lloigor" (1969) by Colin Wilson

See also
 Lloigoroth, a Marvel Comics character
 Lloegyr, the medieval Welsh name for a region of Britain
 Lloegr, the Welsh name for England